The Golden Apples of the Sun is a limited edition compilation of contemporary folk music curated by musician Devendra Banhart for the art magazine Arthur Magazine. It collected 20 songs performed by recent underground folk and psychedelic artists and has since become considered the definitive compilation of what some have dubbed the New Weird America movement. It also featured artwork by Banhart himself.

Track listing 
 Vetiver (with Hope Sandoval) – "Angel's Share"
 Joanna Newsom – "Bridges and Balloons"
 Six Organs of Admittance – "Hazy SF"
 Viking Moses – "Crosses"
 Josephine Foster – "Little Life"
 Espers – "Byss & Abyss"
 Vashti Bunyan & Devendra Banhart – "Rejoicing in the Hands"
 Jana Hunter – "Farm, CA"
 Currituck Co. – "The Tropics of Cancer"
 White Magic – "Don't Need"
 Iron & Wine – "Fever Dream"
 Diane Cluck – "Heat from Every Corner"
 Matt Valentine – "Mountains of Yaffa"
 Entrance – "You Must Turn"
 Jack Rose – "White Mule"
 Little Wings – "Look at What the Light Did Now"
 Scout Niblett – "Wet Road"
 Troll – "Mexicana"
 CocoRosie – "Good Friday"
 Antony – "The Lake"

References

New Weird America albums
Compilation albums included with magazines
2004 compilation albums